Bourret's box turtle (Cuora bourreti), also known commonly as the central Vietnamese flowerback box turtle and the Indochinese box turtle, is a species of turtle in the family Geoemydidae. The species is endemic to Southeast Asia.

Geographic range
C. bourreti is found in central Vietnam and adjacent Laos.

Habitat

Description
Adult females and adult males are about the same size.

Taxonomy
Although Stuart and Parham (2004) argued that C. bourreti was quite distinct, possibly enough to justify its elevation to a full species, osteologic studies have shown that it probably better remains as a subspecies of C. galbinifrons. This is further substantiated by the finding of intergradation zones in north-central Vietnam, where hybrid populations of C. g. galbinifrons and C. g. bourreti are known to exist.

Etymology
C. bourreti is named in honor of French herpetologist René Léon Bourret.

In captivity
The Vietnamese press has reported successful breeding of C. bourreti at a turtle farm in Dak Lak, Vietnam by a pharmacist who studied in France.

Two Bourret's box turtles hatched at the National Zoo in the United States on 12 June 2017.

Gallery

References

Further reading
Fritz U, Petzold A, Auer M (2006). "Osteology in the Cuora galbinifrons complex suggests conspecifity of C. bourreti and C. galbinifrons, with notes on shell osteology and phalangeal formulae within the Geoemydidae". Amphibia- Reptilia 27 (2): 195–205.
Fritz U, Ziegler T, Herrmann H-W, Lehr E (2002). "Intergradation between subspecies of Cuora galbinifrons Bourret, 1939 and Pyxidea mouhotii (Gray, 1862) in southern North Vietnam". Faunistiche Abhandlungen Staatliches Museum für Tierkunde Dresden 23 (3): 59–74.
Obst FJ, Reimann M (1994). "Bemerkenswerte Variabilität bei Cuora galbinifrons Bourret, 1939, mit Beschreibung einer neuen geographischen Unterart: Cuora galbinifrons bourreti subsp. nov." Zoologische Abhandlungen, Staatliches Museum für Tierkunde Dresden 48: 125–138. (Cuora galbinifrons bourreti, new subspecies). (in German).
Stuart BL, Parham JF (2004). "Molecular phylogeny of the critically endangered Indochinese box turtle (Cuora galbinifrons)". Molecular Phylogenetics and Evolution 31: 164–177. (Cuora bourreti, new status).

External links

Cuora
Turtles of Asia
Reptiles of Laos
Reptiles of Vietnam
Reptiles described in 1994